Labo, officially the Municipality of Labo, is a 1st class municipality in the province of Camarines Norte, Philippines. According to the 2020 census, it has a population of 109,245 people.

Geography
The town of Labo is geographically located relatively at the center of the province of Camarines Norte. It is approximately 335 kilometers south of Manila and 15 kilometers away from Daet, the capital town of the province. It is situated at the coordinates between 14°01'06" and 14°11" North latitudes and 122°21'00" and 122°52'20" East longitudes. On the North, it is bounded by the municipalities of Paracale, Jose Panganiban, and Capalonga, on the South, by the province of Quezon, adjoining province of Camarines Sur, on the East by the municipalities of Vinzons and San Vicente, and on the West by the municipality of Santa Elena. The Maharlika highway links this municipality to provinces and cities of the Bicol Region and the Calabarzon (Region IV-A) region.

Its aggregate land area of 648.84 km2 occupies more than 25% of the total land area of the province. Its 52 component barangays represent 18.44% of the total barangays of the province. There are ten (10) classified as urban barangays namely Bagacay, Cabusay, Fundado, Anahaw, Bagong Silang I, Dalas, Gumamela, Kalamunding, Malasugui, Pinya, San Francisco, Talobatib and Tulay na Lupa, and the remaining forty two are considered as rural.

The surface of the municipality is generally rugged, rolling hills and mountainous terrain with relative small rollings and flat terrain. Mt. Cadig (736 meters above sea level), Mt. Labo (1544 meters above sea level), Mt. Bagacay (786 meters above sea level) and Mt. Nalisbitan (265 meters above sea level) form the Southern Cordillera. Boundaries of Camarines Norte, Camarines Sur, and Quezon provinces converge on Mt. Labo, which is the highest peak in the province. Mt. Bagacay serves as a boundary between municipalities of Paracale and Labo and it as well guards the municipality from strong north winds especially during typhoons. Mt. Labo, Mt. Bagacay, and Mt. Cadig are the three major known dormant volcanoes in the municipality. The north-west portion of the municipality is greatly affected by 2 major fault and earthquake lines accruing in the province, while other trends affect north-north-west along Mt. Cadig passing through the barangays of Guisican and Bayabas. Like its neighbors, Panganiban and Paracale, there is a vast deposit of gold ore in the mountains of Labo, Camarines Norte. It is believed that Mt. Bagacay hides the treasures of Gen. Yamashita and is the target of both local and foreign treasure hunters and bounty seekers.

Barangays

Labo is politically subdivided into 52 barangays.

Climate

There is no pronounced dry season and maximum rain period from December to January.

Demographics

Economy

Labo being located at the center of the province. It serves as the agricultural center as well as potential investment destination and promotion center for business, trades, and secondary industrial growth center. It is abundant with natural resources such as gold, nickel, iron, magnetite sand, copper, lead and manganese. Most of the provincial water supplies are located at barangay Tulay na Lupa and Lugui which serves seven out of the 12 municipalities. Agriculture is the leading livelihood of the residents of Labo. Due to abundant forest products such as rattan and bamboo, local folks tend to manufacture and market handicrafts.

An area of 390.39 km2 (65.17% of municipal's land area) is devoted to agricultural crop production, 343.46 km2 of which are coconut plantations. On the other hand, 18.47 km2 is used for rice production. Banana production is also popular in the province, followed by pineapple and pili.

Tourism is also a good source of income for Labo, being surrounded by freshwater and mountains suitable for hikings.

Other community livelihood follows: pineapple and coco-based processing and preservation, pineapple weaving (Barong), jewelry making and accessories, foods manufacturing and beverages processing, other tourism related industries and wood and bamboo furniture making.

Tourism

Waterfalls
Saltahan Falls - barangay Awitan
Palanas Falls  - barangay Pag-asa
Maligaya Falls - barangay Submakin
Binuang Falls - barangay Daguit
Malatap Falls - barangay Malatap
Burok-Busok Falls - barangay Bagong Silang II
Turayog Falls - barangay Fundado

Caves
Mt. Cadig Cave - Located at Mt. Cadig, barangay Bayabas. Along the highway it is 52 km drive from the town proper. From Maharlika highway it can be hiked via barangay Bayabas or barangay Guisican. Hills, trees and rocky slopes hide this cave from view. The cave is composed of several dark compartments of stalactites and stalagmites. This cave is getting attention to become town's priority tourist attraction.
Mambuaya Cave - barangay Fundado
 Pintong Gubat

Rivers
Busig-on River
Labo River
Matogdon River
Abasig River - barangay Baay
Sinag-Tala

Recreation and hiking
Saltahan Falls - barangay Awitan
Labo People's Park
Kukod Kabayo Rest Area
Tan-awan / Bilad na Bato - barangay Fundado

Festivals and cultural entertainment
Busig-on Festival
May Festival
Agro-Industrial Fair
Search for "Miss Labo"
Search for "Mr. Labo"
Miss Gay Beauty Pageant
Annual Marian Exhibit and procession - held every September 8 as part of Mary's birthday celebration and the founding anniversary of Labo, an exposition of priceless arts composed of antiques, vintages and new images of Maria the mother of Jesus. The local artisans, camameros and florists of Camarines Norte and Camarines Sur joined in cooperation with the local government of Labo and the Diocese of Daet for the preparation of this event, from the exhibition ended with Marian procession.

Historical landmarks
Gen. Vicente R. Lukban Landmark
Battle of Tigbinan
Hagdan Bato
Labo Museum
Veteran's Monument
Centennial Monument
Basilio Bautista

Churches
Parish of Saint John The Apostle & Evangelist
Parish of Saint Didacus of Alcala in Bagong Silang
Quasi-Parish of the Holy Family in Talobatib
Holy Trinity College Seminary in Bautista
Saint Cajetan Parish Church Tulay na Lupa

References

 Labo - the Hidden Paradise brochure
 Jose Ramon B. Lagatuz, Kasaysay - Pamana ng Lahi, Alay sa mga Taga-Labo
 Labo Municipal Annual Accomplishment Report
 Daloy ng Kasaysayan I
 Carlos C. Galvez, contributed the "Ang Epiko ni Busig-on." He is the main contributor of the BUSIG-ON Festival.

External links
Labo at Camarines Norte provincial website
 [ Philippine Standard Geographic Code]
Philippine Census Information

Municipalities of Camarines Norte